Resthills Park is a multi-use sports venue and public park located in Glenview, an outer suburb of Hamilton, New Zealand. It currently serves as the home ground for Waikato RL in the Bartercard Premiership rugby league competition, as well as the Waikato FC football (soccer) team in the New Zealand Football Championship.

Sports venues in Hamilton, New Zealand